DXRP is a call sign assigned to two radio stations owned by the Philippine Broadcasting Service in Davao City, Philippines:

 DXRP-AM, an AM radio station with the brand Radyo Pilipinas
 DXRP-FM, an FM radio station with the brand FM1